Omar Hagag (born 13 March 1990) is an Egyptian handball player for Mleha  and the Egyptian national team.

He represented Egypt at the 2019 World Men's Handball Championship.

References

1990 births
Living people
Egyptian male handball players